NGC 522, also occasionally referred to as PGC 5218 or UGC 970, is a spiral galaxy located approximately 122 million light-years from the Solar System in the constellation Pisces. It was discovered on 25 September 1862 by astronomer Heinrich Louis d'Arrest.

Observation history 
D'Arrest discovered NGC 522 using his 11-inch refractor telescope at Copenhagen. He located the galaxy's position with a total of two observations. As the position matches both UGC 962 and PGC 5190, the objects are generally referred to as synonymous. NGC 522 was later catalogued by John Louis Emil Dreyer in the New General Catalogue, where the galaxy was described as "extremely faint, pretty large, irregular figure, perhaps cluster plus nebula".

Description 
The galaxy can be observed edge-on from Earth, thus appearing very elongated. It can be classified as spiral galaxy of type Sbc using the Hubble Sequence. The object's distance of roughly 120 million light-years from the Solar System can be estimated using its redshift and Hubble's law.

See also 
 Spiral galaxy 
 List of NGC objects (1–1000)
 Pisces (constellation)

References

External links 

 
 SEDS

Spiral galaxies
Pisces (constellation)
0522
5218
00970
Astronomical objects discovered in 1862
Discoveries by Heinrich Louis d'Arrest